Johan Börje Ryström (born 13 January 1964) is a Swedish professional golfer.

Ryström grew up in Köping. He started playing golf at age six and was a scratch golfer by age fifteen.

in August 1986, Ryström won the Nordic Championship over 72 holes in Hvide Klit, Denmark. Later that year he represented Sweden at the Eisenhower Trophy in Caracas, Venezuela, finishing 4th with his team and 9th individually.

He turned professional after the 1986 season and won three times on the Challenge Tour. He had six top-10 finishes on the Challenge Tour in 2000 including victory in the Costa Blanca Challenge after beating Henrik Stenson in a playoff.

Ryström twice graduated from the Challenge Tour but never won a European Tour title, finishing runner-up three times. He tied for second in the 1992 Monte Carlo Open together with Mark McNulty, two strokes behind Ian Woosnam. Later the same year he tied for second at the Open de Catalonia, one stroke behind José Rivero. In the 1993 Honda Open he lost in a playoff to Sam Torrance.

Ryström earned a medical exemption for the 2003 season after suffering an elbow injury in 2002, but that were to be his last season. His European Tour official prize money 1988–2003 totaled €886,715.

Amateur wins
1986 Nordic Championship

Professional wins (8)

Challenge Tour wins (3)

Challenge Tour playoff record (2–0)

Swedish Golf Tour wins (5)

Playoff record
European Tour playoff record (0–1)

Results in major championships

Note: Ryström only played in The Open Championship.

CUT = missed the half-way cut
"T" = tied

Team appearances
Amateur
European Amateur Team Championship (representing Sweden): 1985
Eisenhower Trophy (representing Sweden): 1986
St Andrews Trophy (representing the Continent of Europe): 1986

Professional
Europcar Cup (representing Sweden): 1987, 1988 (winners)
World Cup (representing Sweden): 1988

References

External links

Swedish male golfers
European Tour golfers
Sportspeople from Stockholm County
People from Köping
People from Lidingö Municipality
1964 births
Living people